Frank Raubicheck (1857–1952) was an American painter and etcher who arrived in the United States from Bohemia in the 1870s.  He was an art student at the University of Munich and began his career as a painter while still in Europe.  His style has been compared to that of Claude Monet.

In the 1880s, Raubicheck painted and sold many impressionist landscapes, many of which are scenes on the East End of Long Island. He also established himself during this time as an etcher of some renown. One of his works is in the permanent collection of the Parrish Art Museum in Southampton, New York and several appear in an edition of Washington Irving's Knickerbocker's History of New York, published in 1886 by the Grolier Club in New York. He was one of the creators of the official seal for the Grolier Club, which still hangs on the banner outside the club's E. 60th Street address in Manhattan.

In 1892, he exhibited more than 40 paintings at the Fifth Avenue Auction House in New York under the management of William B. Norman and the E. W. Noyes Gallery in Boston, Massachusetts. These paintings were a result of three years' work in Bavaria, the Netherlands and Belgium. In the mid-1890s, he went to work as an etcher and illustrator for The New York Times and worked there until the paper moved from Park Row to midtown in 1906.

He continued painting throughout the remainder of his life, which was spent in Cambridge, Massachusetts, and Hartsdale, New York, in Westchester County.

References 
Etching, "Untitled (Girl Playing Lute; after Edward Percy Moran) circa 1885. Permanent Collection, Parrish Art Museum, Southampton, New York. 
A History of New York By Diedrich Knickerbocker," Washington Irving, 1886.  Printed for the Grolier Club.  A New Edition Containing Unpublished Corrections  of the Author, With Illustrations by Geo. H. Broughton, Will H. Drake, and Howard Pyle, and Etchings by Henry C. Eno and F. Raubicheck. In Two Volumes. 
Auction Catalogue, Noyes Gallery, March 1892, Boston, Massachusetts, Archives of American Art, New York, NY
Auction Catalogue, Norman Auction, December 1892, Fifth Avenue Auction House, Archives of American Art, New York, NY

1847 births
American illustrators
19th-century American painters
19th-century American male artists
American male painters
20th-century American painters
20th-century American male artists
Austro-Hungarian emigrants to the United States
1952 deaths
Bohemian people
Ludwig Maximilian University of Munich alumni
Artists from Cambridge, Massachusetts
People from Hartsdale, New York